Megistostegium nodulosum is a tree in the family Malvaceae. It is endemic to Madagascar.

Description
Its thin leaves are orbicular in shape. The flowers are erect with a light pink to red epicalyx and a red to pink corolla. The pollen is yellow when fresh.

Distribution and habitat
Megistostegium nodulosum is found at numerous locations throughout southern Madagascar, including in protected areas. Its habitat is forests from sea level to about  altitude.

Conservation
Megistostegium nodulosum has been assessed as least concern on the IUCN Red List. There are some threats to the species such as from agriculture, mining and wildfires, but these are not yet considered significant threats to mature plants. Megistostegium nodulosum is present in a number of protected areas, including Andohahela National Park and Cap Sainte-Marie Special Reserve.

Uses
Megistostegium nodulosum is locally used in home construction and as charcoal. The bark, leaves and twigs are locally used to treat conditions including eye ailments and stomach aches.

References

Hibisceae
Endemic flora of Madagascar
Trees of Madagascar
Plants described in 1903